Orson Odell Mobley (born March 4, 1963) is a former professional American football tight end who played in the National Football League (NFL) for five seasons for the Denver Broncos after being drafted in the sixth round. He played in three Super Bowls, XXI, XXII, and XXIV and started in two of them. Mobley ran into problems with the league late in his career and was suspended for substance abuse violations.

College career
Mobley signed with Florida State University out of high school, then transferred from Florida State where he played football and baseball to Salem where he played both tight end and punter for Terry Bowden and starred along with future Florida State Head Coach Jimbo Fisher.  Mobley won All-West Virginia Conference honors at Salem.

Professional career
Mobley was picked 151st in the 6th round of the 1986 NFL Draft by the Denver Broncos. He caught a career high 22 passes and averaged 15.1 yards per reception as a rookie. Mobley's blocking paved the way for Bobby Humphrey to run for consecutive 1,000 yard seasons.

Mobley was named Bronco's Player of the Game after having 6 receptions for 55 yards vs. the Browns on November 13, 1988.  He played in three Super Bowls.

Receiving record

Personal life
Mobley currently lives in Jacksonville, Florida.

Media references
On the show Night After Night with Allan Havey, Orson Mobley was portrayed as the owner of a dodgy fictional New Jersey hotel, the Mobley Hotel. The dilapidated hotel was where guests of the show were put up.

References

External links
 
 Nole Fan Archives

Living people
1963 births
People from Brooksville, Florida
American football tight ends
Denver Broncos players
Florida State Seminoles football players
Salem Tigers football players
Players of American football from Florida